Snehadevi S. Reddy (born 13 February 1997) is an Indian former tennis player.

Reddy has a career-high WTA rankings of 449 in singles and 517 in doubles. She won two singles and two doubles titles on tournaments of the ITF Circuit.

On the junior tour, Reddy had a career-high ranking of 59, achieved on 6 January 2014.

Reddy has represented India only one time in Fed Cup, and she lost her match.

ITF Circuit finals

Singles: 2 (2 titles)

Doubles: 8 (2 titles, 6 runner–ups)

External links
 
 
 

1997 births
Living people
Indian female tennis players